Massa Fiscaglia is a frazione of the comune  of Fiscaglia in the Province of Ferrara in the Italian region Emilia-Romagna, located about  northeast of Bologna and about  east of Ferrara. It was a separate comune until 2014.

References

Cities and towns in Emilia-Romagna